The Marine Scout Sniper Rifle or MSSR is a semi-automatic designated marksman rifle developed from the Colt M16A1 rifle by the Philippine Marine Corps Scout Snipers due to the lack of a dedicated precision rifle which is used in the Armed Forces of the Philippines.

The MSSR was developed due to the need of a sniper rifle system that could effectively use 5.56×45mm NATO ammunition (most other sniper rifles use the larger 7.62×51mm NATO cartridge). This was done mainly for cost-saving and availability reasons since the Armed Forces of the Philippines are actively engaged in counter-insurgency and internal security operations, especially against the Moro Islamic Liberation Front (MILF) and the Abu Sayyaf Group.

The shorter effective range of the 5.56 mm cartridge compared to the 7.62 mm was less of a factor due to the shorter ranges encountered in jungle combat, where the rifle is primarily used. Its performance during subsequent combat operations proved the effectiveness of the weapon system, and it was adopted as the primary range sniper rifle (for ranges of up to 600 m) of the Philippine Marine Scout Snipers.

Originally intended to be a temporary solution and slated to be delegated as a designated marksman's rifle upon the acquisition of newer 7.62 mm bolt-action rifles, the MSSR has instead become the primary sniper rifle of the Marine Scout Snipers due to its outstanding performance in the field.

The deployment of the MSSR also allowed the Philippine Marine Corps to retire its M1903 Springfield, M1C Garand and M14 rifles from active service.

History
The MSSR was known to be used in various anti-insurgency operations, including Marawi.

Design
The system was developed in-house under the direction of then Col. Jonathan Martir, PN (M) (GSC), N-6 in 1996 to replace obsolete M1C Garands and M-14 rifles. The MSSR was then made in-house in the Philippine Marine Corp. Then Lt. Col.  Roberto Emmanuel T. Feliciano collaborated with Col. Martir.

The first generation MSSR was deployed in 1996 as an M16A1 with a Tasco variable 3-9 x 40 mm rubber-coated scope on a DPMS Tri-mount atop the carry handle.  This required a Delta HBAR cheek piece on the stock to align the operator's eye with the elevated scope position. The standard handguards were replaced with a free-floating aluminum forearm, and a Harris folding bipod was attached to the underside of the forearm.  The standard M16A1 barrel was replaced with a free-floated 24" (68 cm) DPMS Heavy Stainless Steel Ultra Match barrel with a 1 in 8.5" right-hand twist, with an M16A1 front sight base. A J&P match trigger was installed, which is later used in the second and third generation versions.

The second generation MSSR was created by removing the forward portion of the carry handle and attaching the Tri-mount directly to the top of the upper receiver. The Tasco scope and scope rings were attached to the Tri-mount, which provided a lower scope-to-bore height.  The Delta HBAR cheek piece was no longer required and was removed. The M16A1 front sight base was removed and replaced with a DPMS gas block. The barrel was changed to a DPMS Ultra Match barrel with a 1 in 8" RH twist, and the M16A1 stock and pistol grip were replaced with A2 versions.

The third generation rifle retained the second generation features, but replaced the Tasco scope with a Bushnell variable 3-9 x 40mm scope with a Mil-dot reticle, mounted with three scope rings on the receiver-mounted Tri-mount. For the Philippine Marine Corps, barrel length remained the same at 24" with the 1 in 8" DPMS Ultra Match Barrel. A version with a 20" barrel was made available for the Naval Special Operations Group.

The fourth generation rifles feature a Leupold Mark 4 LR/T M3 scope mounted on a Leupold mount, an 18-inch cold hammer-forged Daniel Defense barrel, a JP match trigger, a Harris swivel bi-pod, a tactical charging handle latch, ambidextrous fire controls, an extended trigger guard and a Magpul Precision-Adjustable stock.  It also comes issued with an AAC SR-5 suppressor, 20-round Magpul magazines and a Pelican carrying case.

The fifth generation rifles differ from the fourth generation by featuring a full-length railed handguard.

Variants

Night Fighting Weapon System

Created in late 2004, the Night Fighting Weapon System (NFWS) was made for the purpose of fighting in forested areas in low-light conditions.  Night vision and regular daytime scopes can be mounted on the rifle via a Picatinny rail on top of the upper receiver.

The rifle is equipped with an integral sound suppressor fabricated in-house out of stainless steel. The suppressor is fitted on a bull barrel (1 inch in diameter) with a 1 in 9" twist.

Special Purpose Rifle

A designated marksman rifle/special purpose rifle (DMR/SPR) variant intended to "meet the requirement for a 5.56mm rifle to engage targets up to 800 meters with optics.".  This rifle would replace the older M14s currently in use as designated marksmen rifles in the Philippine Army.

The new rifle will feature an 18" free-floating bull barrel with a 1 in 7" twist, a standard A2 flash suppressor, a flattop upper receiver with a Picatinny rail, provisions for a bipod and semi and select fire.

The new variant, designated the "Government Arsenal SPR/DMR" was slated to go into service in 2015, with the production of the initial batch of rifles.

Squad Designated Marksman Rifle

The Squad Designated Marksman Rifle (SDMR) is a mid-length carbine similar in configuration to the SEAL Recon Rifle that was developed upon request by the Army's Scout Rangers. It features a railed upper receiver, a mid-length gas system, a Daniel Defense 16-inch cold-hammer forged barrel, a Daniel Defense free-floating railed handguard, a 4x32 Trijicon Advanced Combat Optic, a Magpul STR buttstock, a Hogue grip containing a cleaning kit and a cerakote finish.

An initial batch of forty (40) units of this carbine were turned over to selected AFP Special Operations Forces (SOF) and the Scout Rangers for testing and evaluation.

The rifle was subsequently adopted by other AFP units.

Ammunition
The first-generation MSSR used either factory 5.56mm NATO 62-grain SS109 ball ammunition or 69-grain Federal Match Gold Medal boattail hollowpoint (BTHP) cartridges.

The second-generation rifle may use these rounds as well as the HSM 69-grain BTHP cartridge.

The third-generation MSSR uses 5.56mm 69-grain Hornady BTHP Match or 75-grain Hornady TAP BTHP Match ammunition handloaded at the Marine Scout Sniper School.

Deployment
The MSSR is the main weapon of choice for the Philippine Marine Scout Snipers alongside the newer Remington 700P Intermediate Range Day-Night Scout Sniper Rifle and the Barrett M95 anti materiel rifle.

Sniper teams usually work in pairs with the operator accompanied by a spotter, usually equipped with an M16A2 rifle with an M203 grenade launcher.

Gallery

References

See also
 United States Marine Corps Squad Advanced Marksman Rifle
 United States Army Squad Designated Marksman Rifle
 Mk 12 Special Purpose Rifle
 Tabuk Sniper Rifle

Weapons and ammunition introduced in 1996
5.56×45mm NATO semi-automatic rifles
Sniper rifles
Weapons of the Philippines
ArmaLite AR-10 derivatives